James Gregory Patton (born January 5, 1970) is a former American football defensive lineman who played for the Buffalo Bills of the National Football League. He was drafted by the Buffalo Bills in the second round of the 1992 NFL Draft. He played college football at the University of Texas at Austin and attended Clear Creek High School in League City, Texas.

College career
Patton played for the Texas Longhorns, earning First-team All-Southwest Conference honors in 1990 and 1991. He was also the MVP of the Longhorns' 1991 team. He received a Bachelor and Master of Business Administration from University of Texas at Austin.

Professional career
Patton was selected by the Buffalo Bills with the 55th pick in the 1992 NFL Draft. He missed the 1992 season due to injury. Patton played in 14 games while in Buffalo after being hobbled by hip injuries Patton was released by the Bills on December 12, 1995.

Personal life
Patton is now CEO of The Boon Group in Austin, Texas and CEO of FairPrice Healthcare, LLC.

References

External links
Just Sports Stats
Player Profile
Rookie Card UT
Rookie Card Buffalo
Football Card
Football Card Image

Living people
1970 births
Players of American football from Texas
American football defensive linemen
Texas Longhorns football players
Buffalo Bills players
21st-century American businesspeople
Businesspeople from Texas
People from Brazoria County, Texas